Cham Gard is a village in Radkan Rural District, in the Central District of Chenaran County, Razavi Khorasan Province, Iran. At the 2006 census, its population was 437, in 101 families.

References 

Populated places in Chenaran County